Abacion magnum is a species of crested millipede in the family Abacionidae. It is found in North America. In captivity Abacion magnum is known to feed on dead insects as well as dead members of its own species.

References

Further reading

 

Millipedes of North America
Articles created by Qbugbot
Animals described in 1943
Callipodida